Live 1981–82 is a live album by The Birthday Party and released in August 1999. The performances were "[c]ulled from the private collection of founding member Mick Harvey with assistance from super fan Henry Rollins".

Reception
The album received very positive reviews from various sources. "Though various live releases had emerged over the course of the band's existence," writes Ned Raggett for Allmusic, "no full-length capturing of the Party's particular bacchanalia approved by the group had officially emerged until this release [...][The album] threatens at all points to leap from the speakers and throttle innocent bystanders." Tim Peacock of Record Collector called it "a vital addendum to the pioneering Aussies’ oeuvre." Matt Mernagh of Exclaim! writes: "the only live album from these Australian bastards is a brilliant effort in capturing pure chaos. Whether it’s Nick Cave’s howls and murderous screams, Harvey’s squalor of blues guitar playing, Rowland S. Howard’s high pitched guitar riffs, Tracy Pew’s thumping bass being buried in the background and Phil Calvert’s hammering drum sound, this beast finds the band at their peak. [...] By performing so well together, the frenzied noise has been planned, although it doesn’t seem like that could be humanly possible." He notes the audience response as being "enthused and stunned at the same time." He finds the only downside of the album to be the fact that it "has been taken from three different locations and melded into one piece of music" instead of being from a single live show. The sound quality of the performances received praise, as did the band's cover of "Fun House", the latter of which has been described as "viciously maul[ed] and deface[ed] [in comparison to the original]" and a "relentless eight-minute thrash [...] with Jim ‘Foetus’ Thirlwell riding shotgun on sax that provides a suitably Bacchanalian climax."

Track listing

Tracks 1 - 10: Recorded at The Venue, London, UK, 1981
Tracks 11-16: Recorded at Aladin, Bremen, Germany, 1982
Track 17: Recorded at Sporting, Athens, Greece, 1982

Personnel

Birthday Party
 Phill Calvert — drums (tracks 1-10)
 Nick Cave — vocals
 Mick Harvey — guitar (tracks 1-10), drums (tracks 11-17)
 Rowland Howard — guitar
 Tracy Pew — bass
 Jim Thirlwell — saxophone (track 17)

Credits
 Mixing — Lindsay Gravina
 Mastering — David Macquarie
 Photography— Bleddyn Butcher

Release history

References

External links
  Live 1981–82 @ Allmusic
 Live 1981-82 @ Discogs
 Live 1981-82 @ MusicBrainz

The Birthday Party (band) albums
1999 live albums